Xanthapanteles is a genus of braconid wasps in the family Braconidae. There is at least one described species in Xanthapanteles, X. cameronae, found in Argentina.

References

Microgastrinae